The Electron Hydroelectric Project, originally known as the Puyallup Project, is a hydroelectric power plant operated by Electron Hydro LLC on the Puyallup River in Pierce County, Washington. It generates  of electricity and is operated and maintained by approximately 20 full-time employees.

Location

Technology
The project, which was completed in 1904, draws water from the Puyallup River behind the Electron Diversion Dam, then funnels it to the Electron power plant via a  span of wooden flume running along the side hills of the winding river valley while the river runs down a steep canyon. Original construction took approximately 14 months to complete. The grade is uniform and runs at seven feet of elevation per mile.  

A light railway line was built on top of the flume to shuttle maintenance workers and equipment. It is known as "the crookedest railway in the world," but it is not the only railway line with this claim.

The flume and the railway were rebuilt in the 1940s, then again in 1985 on the original track. The flume is supported with over 6,000 bents. The flume is lined with 5.5 million board feet of fir. Electron Hydro, LLC is in the process of rebuilding the wood liner with Alaska yellow cedar and possibly coated with Polyurea. It is notable for likely being the largest flume in use for hydroelectric projects in the United States.

Fish passage facilities
The upstream migration of spawning adult salmon and rainbow trout is possible by a concrete,  fish ladder built alongside the wooden diversion dam opposite the flume intake. Migrating juvenile fish that inadvertently enter the wooden flume downstream will be captured alive and placed back in the Puyallup River using a trap-and-haul facility, which is located in the storage reservoir’s forebay.

Controversy
On July 29, 2020, Electron Hydro, the company that owns and operates the dam, experienced an industrial accident in which crumb rubber debris was released into the Puyallup River. Astro-turf used as part of a cofferdam broke loose from the HDPE liner and was spilled into the river. The company took immediate action to rectify the spill.

References

External links

Historic American Engineering Record in Washington (state)
Hydroelectric power companies of the United States
Puyallup, Washington
Light rail in Washington (state)
Energy infrastructure completed in 1904
1904 establishments in Washington (state)
Hydroelectric power plants in Washington (state)
Puget Sound Energy
Puyallup River